In mathematics, specifically in category theory, a semi-abelian category is a pre-abelian category in which the induced morphism  is a bimorphism, i.e., a monomorphism and an epimorphism, for every morphism .

Properties

The two properties used in the definition can be characterized by several equivalent conditions.

Every semi-abelian category has a maximal exact structure.

If a semi-abelian category is not quasi-abelian, then the class of all kernel-cokernel pairs does not form an exact structure.

Examples

Every quasi-abelian category is semi-abelian. In particular, every abelian category is semi-abelian. Non quasi-abelian examples are the following.

 The category of (possibly non Hausdorff) bornological spaces is semi-abelian.
 Let  be the quiver

and  be a field. The category of finitely generated projective modules over the algebra  is semi-abelian.

History

The concept of a semi-abelian category was developed in the 1960s. Raikov conjectured that the notion of a quasi-abelian category is equivalent to that of a semi-abelian category. Around 2005 it turned out that the conjecture is false.

Left and right semi-abelian categories

By dividing the two conditions on the induced map in the definition, one can define left semi-abelian categories by requiring that  is a monomorphism for each morphism . Accordingly, right semi-abelian categories are pre-abelian categories such that  is an epimorphism for each morphism .

If a category is left semi-abelian and right quasi-abelian, then it is already quasi-abelian. The same holds, if the category is right semi-abelian and left quasi-abelian.

Citations

References 

 José Bonet, J., Susanne Dierolf, The pullback for bornological and ultrabornological spaces. Note Mat. 25(1), 63–67 (2005/2006).
 Yaroslav Kopylov and Sven-Ake Wegner, On the notion of a semi-abelian category in the sense of Palamodov, Appl. Categ. Structures 20 (5) (2012) 531–541.
 Wolfgang Rump, A counterexample to Raikov's conjecture, Bull. London Math. Soc. 40, 985–994 (2008).
 Wolfgang Rump, Almost abelian categories, Cahiers Topologie Géom. Différentielle Catég. 42(3), 163–225 (2001).
 Wolfgang Rump, Analysis of a problem of Raikov with applications to barreled and bornological spaces, J. Pure and Appl. Algebra 215, 44–52 (2011).
 Dennis Sieg and Sven-Ake Wegner, Maximal exact structures on additive categories, Math. Nachr. 284 (2011), 2093–2100.

Additive categories